Donald Archibald Joseph Pius McDougal (October 29, 1872 – November 3, 1942) was a lawyer and politician in Ontario, Canada. He represented the riding of Ottawa  from 1905 to 1908 and Ottawa East from 1908 to 1911 in the Legislative Assembly of Ontario as a Liberal.

The son of Francis McDougal and Amelia McGillis, he was born in Ottawa and was educated at the University of Ottawa and Osgoode Hall Law School. He served as an Ottawa alderman for one year.

He died in Ottawa at the age of 70.

During the early to mid 1890s McDougal was active as an athlete on the Ottawa Hockey Club and as a football player on the Ottawa College team.

References

External links 
 

1872 births
1942 deaths
Ontario Liberal Party MPPs